Penton is a census-designated place and unincorporated community in Chambers County, Alabama, United States. Its population was 163 as of the 2020 census.

Demographics

Notable person
Pete Turnham, served in the Alabama House of Representatives from 1958 to 1998

References

Census-designated places in Chambers County, Alabama
Census-designated places in Alabama